Troy High School may refer to: 

Troy High School (Alabama), in Troy, Alabama, building listed on the National Register of Historic Places
Troy High School (California) in Fullerton, California
Troy Junior-Senior High School in Troy, Idaho
Troy High School (Kansas) in Troy, Kansas
Troy High School (Michigan) in Troy, Michigan
Troy Buchanan High School in Troy, Missouri
Troy High School (Montana) in Troy, Montana
Troy High School (New York) in Troy, New York
Troy High School (Ohio) in Troy, Ohio
Troy Christian High School in Troy, Ohio
Troy Public High School in Troy, Pennsylvania, building listed on the National Register of Historic Places
Troy High School (Texas) in Troy, Texas
East Troy High School in East Troy, Wisconsin